"Boys Like You" is a song recorded by South Korean girl group Itzy. It was released by JYP Entertainment and Republic Records on October 21, 2022. The song is the group's first English single and serves as a pre-release for the group's sixth EP Cheshire. "Boys Like You" is a pop song with punk elements composed by Didrik Thott, Sebastian Thott, Hayley Aitken and written by Didrik Thott, Hayley Aitken, Sara Davis, Ellie Suh (153/Joombas) and Juhee Lee (MUMW).

Background and release 
On October 17, JYP Entertainment announced that Itzy would release an English single titled "Boys Like You", which would serve as a pre-release song for the group's upcoming album. The first teaser for the music video was released the following day.

A concept poster of the members was released on October 19, while a second teaser for the music video was released the next day. The song along with its music video were released on October 21.

Composition 
The song was composed by Didrik Thott, Sebastian Thott, and Hayley Aitken, while the lyrics was written by Didrik Thott, Hayley Aitken, Sara Davis, Ellie Suh, and Lee Joo Hee. Arrangement was handled by Sebastian Thott. A pop song with punk elements, its lyrics sends a warning to an immature partner.

Credits and personnel 
Credits adopted from Melon.

Studio
 JYP Studios — digital editing, recording
 The Hub Studio A — recording
 Chapel Swing Studios — mixing
 Sterling Sound — mastering

Personnel

 Itzy — vocals
 Didrik Thott — lyricist, composition
 Hayley Aitken — lyricist, composition
 Sara Davis — lyricist 
 Ellie Suh (153/Joombas) — lyricist 
 Juhee Lee (MUMW) — lyricist 
 Sebastian Thott — composition, arrangement, keyboard, sessions computer programming
 Frankie Day (The Hub) — background vocals, vocal director 
 Brian U — vocal director, recording
 Friday (Galactica) — vocal director
 Lee Sang-yeop — digital editing, recording 
 Lim Chan-mi — digital editing 
 Um Se-hee — recording 
 Ku Hye-jin — recording 
 Tony Maserati — mixing 
 David K — mixing 
 Younghyun — mixing 
 Valley Glen — mixing 
 Chris Gehringer — mastering

Charts

Release history

References 

Itzy songs
English-language South Korean songs
JYP Entertainment singles
Republic Records singles